The Hope Forest shooting was a familicide in Hope Forest, Southern Australia, Australia, on 6 September 1971, in which Clifford Bartholomew shot dead his wife, their seven children, his wife's sister and her son with a .22-caliber rifle. It is the worst familicide in Australian history.

Background 
Hope Forest is a farmhouse that is located 35 miles away from Adelaide, the capital of South Australia, which Clifford lived with his wife and seven children. Near it was a cottage that Winnie Keane and her son were living in that was being rented from a local farmer. Clifford was a 40 year old truck driver at the time of the shooting and had relationship problems with his wife, Heather, after she seemed to be having an affair with another man.

Incident 
The shooting occurred around 1pm. All of the victims were asleep at the time of the shooting. Heather was sleeping when Clifford struck her in the head with a mallet. She then woke up screaming. Clifford then shot her in the head with his .22 caliber rifle. His other victims were shot through the head using the same rifle and some of them were also hit using a mallet in order to subdue them. Three of the children tried to escape after being awakened by the initial shots, however they were both shot down a hall. Winnie Keane and her son Daniel managed to escape the farmhouse but Clifford managed to shoot them both. Clifford was moving from room to room when he was doing his rampage. After the shooting, Clifford was arrested at 8pm.

Aftermath 
Clifford was charged for the murder of his wife and pleaded guilty to the court and was initially sentenced to death, but was later changed to a life sentence and was then released after serving eight years on parole. He changed his name to Clifford Palmer and remarried and raised a family with seven stepchildren, without any knowledge of his crimes. It wasn't until years after his death the family learned about his actions.

See also 

 Timeline of major crimes in Australia

References 

Mass murder in 1971
Mass murder in Australia
Mass shootings in Australia
1971 crimes in Oceania
Familicides
1970s in Western Australia